Samson Shukardin is the bishop of the Diocese of Hyderabad, Pakistan.

Early life and education
Shukardin  was born on 29 January 1961, in Hyderabad. After schooling at St Bonaventure's High School in Hyderabad and at Government Boys College, he entered the Order of Friars Minor.  He was at the Order for a number of years.

In 1992, Shukardin graduated with a Bachelor of Arts degree from the Sindh University, Jamshoro, and later earned a degree in Theology at the National Catholic Institute of Theology in Karachi. In 1998, he completed a degree in Civil Law studies at the Sindh Muslim Law College.

Career
Shukardin was ordained a priest on 10 December 1993. Since then he has served from 1993 to 1996 as assistant priest in Gujrat, Diocese of Islamabad-Rawalpindi;  from 1996 to 2004 as Procurator of the Franciscan Province; from 2004 to 2008 as Guardian of the Franciscan Order and President of the Conference of Major Superiors of Pakistan; since 2008 as pastor of St. Elizabeth Church in Hyderabad, and Diocesan Director of the National Commission for Justice and Peace. Since 2010, he has been the Vicar General of the Diocese of Hyderabad.

In 2020, Shukardin became chairperson of the National Commission for Justice and Peace.

Appointment
On 16 December 2014, Pope Francis accepted the resignation of Bishop Max John Rodrigues in accordance with canon 401 § 1 of the Code of Canon Law. The Pope then appointed Shukardin as the new bishop of the diocese.

Shukardin was consecrated bishop on 31 January 2015. The principal consecrator was Max John Rodrigues, Bishop Emeritus of Hyderabad, while the co-consecrators were Archbishop Joseph Coutts of Karachi and Archbishop Sebastian Francis Shaw of Lahore.

The Diocese of Hyderabad covers 137,000 square kilometers, with a population of 22,300,000 of which almost 50,000 are Catholic. It is served by 15 parishes, 30 priests, and 89 nuns.

Recent events
Speaking against  discrimination against religious minorities, Shukardin told reporters on 10 December 2015, that Pakistan's human rights record was so poor that it was voted off the U.N. Human Rights Council.

On 1 December 2015, along with many other former students, Shukardin gathered at the Karachi Gymkhana to celebrate the 94th birthday of his former school teacher John Baptist Todd.

In August 2020, Bishop Shukardin ordained to the priesthood Fr Sunil Ashraf and Father Perkho Sono OFM, in the St. Francis Xavier Cathedral, Hyderabad.

References

External links

1961 births
Living people
21st-century Roman Catholic bishops in Pakistan
Pakistani Friars Minor
Roman Catholic bishops of Hyderabad in Pakistan